Liam David Harvey (born 20 January 2005) is a Scottish professional footballer who plays as a striker for Scottish Premiership side Aberdeen. On 11 May 2022, he made his senior debut for Aberdeen coming on as a second-half substitute in a 1–0 League loss against St Johnstone. He began with the Dons at Under 11s. He has also represented Scotland at Under 17s youth level. He was called up for the Under 17 European Championships. However, Harvey was withdrawn from the squad due to a striker shortage at Aberdeen.

References

2005 births
Living people
Scottish footballers
Aberdeen F.C. players
Scottish Professional Football League players
Association football midfielders
People from Elgin, Moray
Sportspeople from Moray
Scotland youth international footballers